The Mound City Civil War Naval Hospital was a naval hospital in Mound City, Illinois, used by the United States Navy during the Civil War. The hospital was established in 1861 in an existing brick building claimed by the U.S. government. It became one of the largest Union hospitals in the western states during the war.

Treatment at the hospital was led by Catholic nurses from Indiana. In addition to Union soldiers, the hospital also treated Confederate soldiers and freed slaves.

The hospital was added to the National Register of Historic Places on October 9, 1974. It has since been demolished.

Notes

Defunct hospitals in Illinois
National Register of Historic Places in Pulaski County, Illinois
Hospital buildings on the National Register of Historic Places in Illinois
1861 establishments in Illinois
Hospitals established in 1861
Hospitals disestablished in 1865
1865 disestablishments in Illinois